Samuel Brenyah (born ) is a Ghanaian politician and a member of the First Parliament of the Fourth Republic representing the Nsuta/Kwamang Constituency in the Ashanti Region of Ghana. He represented the constituency on the ticket of the National Democratic Congress.

Early life and education 
Samuel Brenyah was born on 27 January 1960 at Sekyere Kwamang in the Ashanti Region of Ghana. He attended Opoku Ware School and the University of Ghana where he obtained his Bachelor of Arts in linguistics. He also attended the University of Ouagadougou and obtained a Higher School Certificate.

Politics 
Samuel Brenyah was elected into parliament on the ticket of the National Democratic Congress for the Nsuta-Kwamang Constituency in the Ashanti Region of Ghana during the 1992 Ghanaian parliamentary election.

Career 
He is a former member of parliament for the Nsuta-Kwamang Constituency and a linguist by profession.

Personal life 
He is a Christian.

References 

Living people
1960 births
Ghanaian MPs 1993–1997
National Democratic Congress (Ghana) politicians
University of Ouagadougou alumni
University of Ghana alumni
Ghanaian Christians
People from Ashanti Region
Linguists from Ghana